Big Brother: Súboj (lit. Big Brother: Duel) is a Slovak version of the reality television franchise Big Brother. It aired for only one season from 18 September 2005 to 18 December 2005 and has no plans in future.

The Slovak version is based on the original Dutch Big Brother series produced by Endemol, where a number of contestants live in an isolated house for a certain period of time. At all times, housemates are under the control of Big Brother, a rule-enforcing authority figure who monitors the behavior of the housemates, sets tasks and punishments, and provides the only link to the outside world for the contestants. The premiere saw thirteen housemates originally enter the house, with four additional people entering at various points during the show.

Housemates

Nominations Table

Notes

Voluntary Exits:
Milan had to leave the House after falling seriously ill within 24 hours of arrival.
Marian had to leave the House after breaking his leg.
Silvia requested to leave the House during her (televised) wedding day - and left the following day so she could be with her new husband.
 Housemates are split into two teams - the red team and the blue team. Each Week Housemates have to each Nominate two members (of their own team) and the one or more Housemate(s) from each team with the most Nominations faces the Public Vote to save. Teams were changed throughout the competition, but mostly stayed the same.
 The Public were allowed to choose Marian's replacement this Week. They voted, and Koketa won the vote with 58.1%; 52-year-old Vladimír Bizoň lost out on the vote. As Koketa was a new Housemate he was not eligible for Nominations this Week.
 This Week, as there were only 3 surviving members of the red team, Nominations were completely open and Housemates could Nominate from either team.
 The teams were re-shuffled this Week to even them out (they were previously unbalanced with 3 reds and 9 blues). Housemates this Week Nominated only one Housemate each to face the Public Vote. On Day 48 Koketa was Ejected from the House for aggressive and obscene behaviour, and although he had previously been Nominated, the Eviction would still take place between the three other Nominees. The Public Voted Erotka into the House as Silvia's replacement with 61.7% of the Vote - beating other hopeful Eva.
 Housemates Nominated a single Housemate from the other team this Week. As a new Housemates Erotka was Immune.
 Housemates Nominated a single Housemate from their OWN team. Pinzo was automatically Nominated for rule-breaking.
 The Housemate who received the most 'save' Votes, had to choose the two Housemates to face the Public Vote.
 For the final night all remaining Housemates faced the Public Vote.

2005 Slovak television seasons
Slovakia
2005 Slovak television series debuts
2005 Slovak television series endings
2000s Slovak television series
Slovak reality television series
Markíza original programming